Mohammad Samad Nikkhah Bahrami (born 11 May 1983) is an Iranian professional basketball player.

Pro career
He previously played for Saba Battery as a subsidiary player, teaming with his since-deceased brother Aidin Nikkhah Bahrami to help the team win the Asian Championship.

Cholet
On August 22, 2008 Nikkhah signed a one-year deal with French LNB side Cholet Basket for an undisclosed fee. By doing so he became the first Iranian to ever play professional basketball in France. He left Cholet on September 30 by mutual consent due to administrative problems.

ÉB Pau-Orthez
On October 21, 2008 Nikkhah Bahrami signed a one-year contract with another French side Élan Béarnais Pau-Orthez.

Career statistics

|-
|style="text-align:left;"|2013–14
|style="text-align:left;"|Fujian Sturgeons
|31||31||42.3||.469||.394||.783||5.7||4.1||1.5||0.1||16.6
|-
|style="text-align:left;"|2015–16
|style="text-align:left;"|Zhejiang Golden Bulls
|38||38||39.3||.413||.335||.756||6.1||3.6||1.7||0.3||17.9
|}

Honours

National team
FIBA Asia Championship
Gold medal: 2007, 2009, 2013
Asian Games
Bronze medal: 2006, 2010
Asian Cup
Gold medal: 2012
Asian Indoor Games
Gold medal: 2009

Club
Asian Championship
Gold medal: 2007, 2008 (Saba Battery), 2009, 2010 (Mahram)
West Asian Championship
Gold medal: 2003 (Sanam), 2009, 2010, 2012 (Mahram)
Iranian Super League
Champions: 2003, 2005 (Sanam), 2008, 2009, 2010, 2011, 2012 (Mahram)

References

External links
Profile at 2008 Beijing Olympics

1983 births
Living people
Asian Games bronze medalists for Iran
Asian Games medalists in basketball
Asian Games silver medalists for Iran
Basketball players at the 2006 Asian Games
Basketball players at the 2008 Summer Olympics
Basketball players at the 2010 Asian Games
Basketball players at the 2014 Asian Games
Basketball players at the 2018 Asian Games
Basketball players at the 2020 Summer Olympics
Cholet Basket players
Élan Béarnais players
Foolad Mahan Isfahan BC players
Fujian Sturgeons players
Guangzhou Loong Lions players
Iranian expatriate basketball people in China
Iranian expatriate basketball people in France
Iranian men's basketball players
Islamic Azad University, Central Tehran Branch alumni
Nanjing Tongxi Monkey Kings players
Mahram Tehran BC players
Medalists at the 2006 Asian Games
Medalists at the 2010 Asian Games
Medalists at the 2014 Asian Games
Medalists at the 2018 Asian Games
Olympic basketball players of Iran
Petrochimi Bandar Imam BC players
Small forwards
Zhejiang Golden Bulls players
2014 FIBA Basketball World Cup players
2019 FIBA Basketball World Cup players